is a Japanese former ski jumper.

In the World Cup his highest place was number 16 from December 1991 in Sapporo.

He participated in the 1992 Winter Olympics in Albertville, where he finished 28th in the normal hill, 25th in the large hill and 4th in the team event.

External links
 
 
 

1966 births
Living people
Japanese male ski jumpers
Ski jumpers at the 1992 Winter Olympics
Olympic ski jumpers of Japan
Sportspeople from Sapporo
20th-century Japanese people